A police station (sometimes called a "station house" or just "house") is a building which serves to accommodate police officers and other members of staff. These buildings often contain offices and accommodation for personnel and vehicles, along with locker rooms, temporary holding cells and interview/interrogation rooms.

Names
Large departments may have many stations to cover the area they serve. The names used for these facilities include:
Barracks for many American state police and highway patrol stations and in Ireland
District office, typically used by American state police forces like the California Highway Patrol, but also used by smaller departments like the Calgary Police Service
Precinct house, or precinct, for some urban police departments in the United States such as the New York City Police Department, Memphis Police Department, and Newark Police Department, where stations are in charge of precincts
Police house
Police office, especially in Scotland
Station house
Substations, smaller stations used by many departments, especially county sheriffs
Detachment, most notably used by the Royal Canadian Mounted Police
Thana, used in the Indian subcontinent
Multiple informal names exist, such as "cop shop", "cophouse" or (in the UK) "nick".

The area a police station serves has a variety of different names, such as precinct, district, division and zone. However, in some police forces such as Hampshire Constabulary, police stations do not serve a specific area and the officers have great flexibility over where they can operate.

Facilities
Typical facilities at police stations typically include:
Office space where officers, detectives and administrative staff can work
Cells for detainees. In the UK, the area with cells is known as a custody suite
Interview rooms for both detainees and non-detained visitors
Evidence rooms for storing evidence and seized property
Lockers and storerooms for storing equipment
A reception desk for public visitors
Car park for fleet vehicles and officer-owned personal vehicles
A room for personnel from other emergency services

Specialized stations exist in a number of countries, typically containing more or less of these facilities. An example includes women's police stations in Latin America.

By country

India
In India, police stations are referred to as 'Thana' or 'Thane'. Police stations have a designated area under their jurisdiction. Police stations are headed by a station house officer (SHO) who may be of inspector or sub-inspector rank, assisted by an assistant sub-inspector, head constables, and constables. The number of personnel in a particular police station depend on many factors like area covered, population, topography, crime rate, sensitivity, important places and others. Some police stations may have police outposts under them. Police outposts are set up when areas covered by police stations have difficult topography, a lack of transportation, high population density, communally sensitive places and border points, or if the area is very large. There are many police stations in India which lack basic infrastructure like proper buildings, landline telephones, wireless sets, vehicles, computers and adequate police personnel. Specialized police stations also exist for specific purposes, such as cyber crime, railway, traffic enforcement, women, and others.

Ireland
The police stations (or barracks) of the Garda Síochána come in the following types, in ascending order of size:
Sub-district stations: Stations in small towns and villages, led by an officer who is no higher in rank than a sergeant. Since the 1980s, many of these small stations have been closed or reduced to operating part-time.
District headquarters: Located in the largest town in a Garda district, with the most senior officer being a superintendent.
Divisional headquarters: Located in the largest town or city within a Garda division, which in turn comprises multiple districts. The most senior officer is a chief superintendent.
Garda headquarters: Located in Phoenix Park, Dublin and includes the office of the Garda Commissioner, as well as other senior officers.

United Kingdom
The county constabularies in Great Britain were previously organised on a village basis. Most villages of any size had a "police house". Police houses in small villages were often staffed by a single uniformed constable, with larger stations being staffed by more. Local police stations were grouped together under the command of a uniformed sergeant, whose station was known as a "sergeant's station". Larger towns in the county constabulary areas had police stations staffed by a number of officers, often under the command of an inspector or superintendent, usually also commanding a sub-division or division respectively, and therefore giving the names of "sub-divisional station" or "divisional station" to their stations.

In Scotland a police station may be referred to as a police office.

United Arab Emirates
As well as traditional, staffed, police stations, there are a number of kiosks in Dubai allowing instant access to police services via a video touchscreen.

Image gallery

See also 
Police
Law enforcement
Law enforcement agency
List of police stations, about notable individual stations
 Custody suite
 Dubai Smart Police Stations
 State police

References